In phonetics, secondary articulation occurs when the articulation of a consonant is equivalent to the combined articulations of two or three simpler consonants, at least one of which is an approximant. The secondary articulation of such co-articulated consonants is the approximant-like articulation. It "colors" the primary articulation rather than obscuring it. Maledo (2011) defines secondary articulation as the superimposition of lesser stricture upon a primary articulation.

Types
There are several kinds of secondary articulation supported by the International Phonetic Alphabet:
Labialization is the most frequently encountered secondary articulation. For example, labialized  has a primary velar plosive articulation, with simultaneous -like rounding of the lips, thus the name.
Palatalization is perhaps best known from  the Russian "soft" consonants like ), which has a primary alveolar plosive articulation, with simultaneous -like (i.e. y-like) raising of the body of the tongue.
Labio-palatalization is simultaneous labialization and palatalization. It is found, for example, in the name Twi.  
Velarization is the raising of the back of the tongue toward the velum, as in the English "dark" L, .
Glottalization involves action of the glottis in addition to the primary articulation of the consonant.

It can sometimes be difficult to distinguish primary and secondary articulation.

Transcription

The most common method of transcription in the IPA is to turn the letter corresponding to the secondary articulation into a superscript written after the letter for the primary articulation. Secondary articulation often has a strong effect on surrounding vowels, and may have an audible realization that precedes the primary consonant, or both precedes and follows it. In the official IPA there remains only an alternative symbol for velarization/pharyngealizaton that is superposed over the primary (e.g.  for dark L), but that has font support for a limited number of consonants and is inadvisable for others, where it can be illegible. A few phoneticians use superscript letters for offglides and subscript letters for simultaneous articulation (e.g.  vs ).

There is a longstanding tradition in the IPA that one may turn any IPA letter into a superscript, and in so doing impart its features to the base consonant. However, the features are not necessarily imparted as secondary articulation. Superscripts are also used iconically to indicate the onset or release of a consonant, the on-glide or off-glide of a vowel, and fleeting or weak segments. Among other things, these phenomena include pre-nasalization, pre-stopping, affrication, pre-affrication, trilled, fricative, nasal, and lateral release, rhoticization, and diphthongs. So, while  indicates velarization of non-velar consonants, it is also used for fricative release of the velar stop.

The 2015 edition of the Extensions to the International Phonetic Alphabet formally advocates superscript letters for the first time since 1989, specifically for the release of plosives.

See also
Labialization
Labio-palatalization
Palatalization (phonetics)
Pharyngealization
Velarization
superscript Latin and Greek letters

Notes

References

 
Phonetics